Champagne Charlie is the third studio album Leon Redbone, released in 1978. It peaked at No. 163 on the Billboard Pop Albums Chart.

Track listing 
LP side A:
 "Champagne Charlie" (Alfred Lee, George Leybourne) – 2:52
 "Please Don't Talk About Me When I'm Gone" (Sidney Clare, Sam Stept) – 2:52
 "Sweet Sue, Just You" (Will Harris, Victor Young) – 2:41
 "The One Rose (That's Left in My Heart)" (Del Lyon, Lani McIntire) – 4:32
 "Alabama Jubilee" (George L. Cobb, Jack Yellen) – 1:42
LP side B:
 "Big Bad Bill (Is Sweet William Now)" (Milton Ager, Jack Yellen) – 3:15
 "Yearning (Just for You)" (Joe Burke, Benny Davis) – 2:48
 "If Someone Would Only Love Me" (Jelly Roll Morton) – 3:31
 "I Hate a Man Like You" (Morton) – 3:41
 "T.B. Blues" (Jimmie Rodgers) – 3:56

Personnel

Musicians

Leon Redbone – vocals, guitar
Ken Whiteley – banjo, washboard
Eddie Davis – drums
George Marge – ocarina
Leon McAuliffe – pedal steel guitar
Eurreal Montgomery – piano
Sammy Price – piano
Jonathan Dorn – tuba
Dennis Drury – trombone
Tom Evans – clarinet
Chris Whiteley – trumpet, bass
Vince Giordano – tuba, bass sax
Julien Barber – violin
Selwart Clarke – viola
Kathryn Kienke – violin
Regis Landiorio – violin
Kermit Moore – cello
William S. Fischer – strings

Technical 
Joel Dorn – producer
Kathy Tufaro – assistant producer
Hal Willner – associate producer
John Cabalka – art direction

References

Leon Redbone albums
1978 albums
Albums produced by Joel Dorn
Warner Records albums